Bruce Michael Dreckman (born August 7, 1970) is an American umpire in Major League Baseball. He wears number 1.

Prior to reaching the MLB, Dreckman umpired in the Appalachian League, Midwest League, Carolina League, Southern League, and American Association. Dreckman has worked the 2004, 2005, 2010, and 2011 National League Division Series, the 2009 and 2013 National League Championship Series, and the 2010 All-Star Game.

Dreckman was among the 54 umpires who were part of the 1999 Major League Umpires Association mass resignation, a labor negotiating tactic that backfired when the major leagues accepted 22 of the resignations (and allowed others to be rescinded).  Dreckman was among those who lost his job, and did not return to the major league diamond as an arbiter until being rehired in 2002.

He was the first base umpire for Roy Halladay's no-hitter in Game 1 of the 2010 NLDS and the home plate umpire for Francisco Liriano's no-hitter in 2011. Dreckman represented the MLB in the 2006 Japan All-Star Series, and worked the Miami round of the 2009 World Baseball Classic. He also was the first base umpire who, on May 13, 2010, called San Francisco Giants catcher Eli Whiteside safe on a bang-bang play at first base after Whiteside hit a line drive off the side of San Diego Padres pitcher Mat Latos. The hit would wind up being the only hit or walk Latos allowed in the game, as an error was committed by second baseman Lance Zawadzki but the error would not have happened because it occurred while trying to complete a double play, something that would have been impossible if Whiteside had been called out. The Padres, at that point, were the only team in MLB history to have never thrown a no-hitter, let alone a perfect game. Replays, however, seem to indicate that Dreckman had made the correct call by calling Whiteside safe.

Dreckman was the third base umpire on July 30, 2017, when Adrián Beltré of the Texas Rangers got his 3000th career hit against the Baltimore Orioles.

Dreckman lives in Marcus, Iowa with his wife and three children.

See also 

 List of Major League Baseball umpires

References

External links
 
MLB.com profile
Retrosheet

1970 births
Living people
People from Le Mars, Iowa
Major League Baseball umpires